Vachellia bucheri is a species of legume in the family Fabaceae found only in Cuba.

References

bucheri
Flora of Cuba
Endangered plants
Taxonomy articles created by Polbot